The Treaty of Habenhausen was the result of peace negotiations after the Second Swedish war on Bremen between  Sweden and the city of Bremen. Negotiations in Habenhausen began November 15, 1666, the main conditions of the treaty were:
Bremen reserves the right to obey directly under the Holy Roman Emperor, but will not visit the parliament before the year 1700, and the city may not use the title of Imperial immediacy in public documents within this period.
Bremen must pay taxes to both the Swedish Crown and to the Holy Roman Emperor.

History of Bremen (state)
Wars involving Sweden